Luigi Efisio Marras (Cagliari, 2 August 1888 - Rome, 29 January 1991) was an Italian general who held the positions of Chief of Staff of the Italian Army and Chief of the Defence Staff.

Biography

From Birth to Promotion to Colonel 
Born and raised in Sardinia, Luigi Efisio Marras began his career in 1906 when he began his training at the Military Academy of Turin. After graduating, he served as an officer in various artillery departments. He would later take part in the Italo-Turkish War and was particularly involved in the occupation of the Dodecanese.

During the First World War he fought in the Balkans against the troops of the Central Powers and after the war, he returned home to work in the operations department of the Italian General Staff.

From 1926, he was serving in a field artillery regiment stationed in Livorno and at the same time was a teacher at the local Military Academy. In 1931 he was promoted to colonel and from 1936 he was given command of a heavy artillery regiment.

His Actions as Military Attaché to Germany and Later Life 
In October 1936, Marras was chosen for the delicate task of being a military attaché in Berlin. In this capacity, he was responsible for the North European area and for relations with the Baltic states. Marras, who soon became known for his courteous nature, also wrote numerous reports on the German armaments situation, paying particular attention to the Wehrmacht and the training of personnel in the war academies. He gave an unusually accurate picture of the German war effort in terms of practical and pragmatic training, but also on human aspects and weaknesses such as pride and arrogance.

From July to November 1939, he was active in Rome and Libya and then transferred back to Berlin.

After 8 September in 1943, he was promoted to lieutenant general and then interned in Germany. On 31 March 1944, the German authorities handed him over to the fascists of the Republic of Salò in northern Italy and since then he was imprisoned in Verona then Gavi and finally in Alexandria, but in August of that same year, he managed to escape to Switzerland.

From May 1945, he was at the head of the Territorial Military Command of Milan and from 1 December 1947 he became Chief of Staff and from 2 December 1950 he was Chief of the Defence Staff, contributing significantly to the reconstruction of the Italian Army after the war.

He retired from active service on 15 April 1954 would die in Rome in 1991.

References 
* Sergio Pelagalli: Il Generale Efisio Marras - Addetto Militare uno Berlino (1936-1943). USSME, Roma, 1994.

External links 

 Biography and photos
 Biographical Dictionary of Italians - Volume 70 (2008)

1888 births
1991 deaths
People from Cagliari
Chiefs of Staff of the Italian Army
Chiefs of Defence Staff (Italy)
Recipients of the Silver Medal of Military Valor
Recipients of the War Merit Cross (Italy)
Italian military personnel of the Italo-Turkish War
Italian military personnel of World War I
Italian military personnel of World War II